Vernon Township is one of the twenty-four townships of Trumbull County, Ohio, United States.  The 2000 census found 1,765 people in the township.

Geography
Located in the northeastern part of the county, it borders the following townships:
Hartford Township - south
Kinsman Township - north
West Salem Township, Mercer County, Pennsylvania - east
South Pymatuning Township, Mercer County, Pennsylvania - southeast
Fowler Township - southwest corner
Johnston Township - west
Gustavus Township - northwest corner

No municipalities are located in Vernon Township, although the unincorporated community of Burghill lies in the southern part of the township.

Name and history
Vernon Township was established in 1806, taking its name from Vernon, Connecticut. Statewide, other Vernon Townships are located in Clinton and Crawford counties.

Government
The township is governed by a three-member board of trustees, who are elected in November of odd-numbered years to a four-year term beginning on the following January 1. Two are elected in the year after the presidential election and one is elected in the year before it. There is also an elected township fiscal officer, who serves a four-year term beginning on April 1 of the year after the election, which is held in November of the year before the presidential election. Vacancies in the fiscal officership or on the board of trustees are filled by the remaining trustees.

References

External links
County website

Townships in Trumbull County, Ohio
Townships in Ohio
1806 establishments in Ohio